A stuffed cookie, also known as a stuffed biscuit, is a type of cookie. Many types of fillings are used, such as nutella, caramel, peanut butter.

List of stuffed cookies/biscuits
Nutella Stuffed Cookies
Nutella stuffed chocolate cookies
 Nutella stuffed chocolate chip cookies
Red velvet nutella stuffed cookies
Nutella stuffed oatmeal hazelnut chocolate chip cookies
Dark chocolate chocolate chip nutella stuffed chocolate cookies
Caramel stuffed chocolate chip cookies
Biscoff stuffed cookies
Caramel stuffed apple cider cookies

Apple stuffed cookies
Chocolate stuffed cookies
Custard-stuffed cookies
Orange stuffed cookies
Date stuffed cookies
Lemon stuffed cookies
Cherry stuffed cookies
Fig stuffed cookies
Fig and walnut stuffed cookies
Coconut stuffed cookies
Apricot stuffed cookies
Quince stuffed cookies
Almond stuffed cookies
Pistachio-stuffed cookies
Hazelnut stuffed cookies
Walnut stuffed cookies
Peanut-stuffed cookies
Poppy-stuffed cookies
White chocolate stuffed cookies
White chocolate stuffed cocoa cookies 
Raspberry stuffed cookies
Murabbalı mecidiye

See also

Cuccidati
Fig roll
 List of cookies

References

External links

Cookies